The Pasadena Boys Choir is one of the oldest civic boy choirs in the United States, founded in 1925 by Dr. John Henry Lyons.

History

Founded in 1925 by Dr. John Henry Lyons as an adjunct of the Pasadena school system, The Pasadena Boys Choir survives today as one of the oldest civic boy choirs in the United States. In 1971, the Choir was reorganized by its current Director, John Barron, as a private, non-profit educational institution. Today the Choir is composed of boys between the ages of 8 and 13 from all ethnic and socio-economic backgrounds who attend public, private and parochial schools throughout the greater San Gabriel and San Fernando Valleys. Since 1971, over 2,000 boys have been members of the Choir.

The organization's admission policy is strictly non-discriminatory and non-denominational and any boy who meets the 8-to-13 age requirement is welcome to apply. All members attend their own schools and the initial time commitment on a boy's part is two two- to three-hour classes each week, after school and on Sundays.

Over the years, the Choir has received numerous awards and commendations. Endorsements have come from the California Parent Teachers Association, the State Superintendent of Schools, and the California State Legislature in Sacramento.

Training Program

Boys that enter the Pasadena Boys Choir program are initially assigned to a Beginner's Class for at least one semester.  There they begin a comprehensive training program which will eventually prepare them for public performance.  The Boys receive professional instruction in music theory, vocal production, ear training, stage deportment and public speaking.   Included in this initial introduction are classical, patriotic, folk, songs from musicals and contemporary pop music.

After successfully completing the beginner's program, boys advance to the next level of training and are moved to the main performance group.  The boys are expected to remain for a full term of training through their eighth grade school year or age 13.

Performances

During a typical season from September to June, the Choir may be called upon to perform in a number of varied concert and entertainment venues.  Among these are weddings, banquets, conventions and seasonal programs.  In addition, occasional calls are received from movie, television and other production companies in the Southern California area.

Summer Camp

The choir operates during the normal school year with the exception of a two-week summer camp session during the last week of July and the first week of August.

Tax Status

The Pasadena Boys Choir is a registered nonprofit organization.

References
Entry at BoyChoirs.org
Entry at The Boy Choir and Soloist Directory

External links

Choirs of children
Choirs in California
Boys' and men's choirs
Musical groups established in 1925
Men in the United States
1925 establishments in California
Culture of Pasadena, California